Chaohu Plain, also known as Chao Lake Plain, is an alluvial plain located in the central Chaohu area of Anhui Province,  with an annual precipitation of about 1,000 mm and a well-developed agriculture. 

Chaohu Plain, part of the Middle and Lower Yangtze Plain (长江中下游平原), is dominated by rice and wheat for its agricultural products. It is one of the main grain producing areas in China.

References

Plains
Landforms of Anhui
Landforms of Asia
Regions of China
Geography of Asia